Clive Robert Humby  (born 3 February 1955) is a British mathematician and entrepreneur in the field of data science and customer-centric business strategies. Since 2014, he has been Chief Data Scientist of the consumer insights company, Starcount.

Early life and education 
Humby was born in Leicester. He attended Sheffield University from 1972 to 1975, graduating with a B.Sc. in Applied Mathematics & Computer Science.

Career 
Humby joined American data analysis specialists CACI in 1976.

He worked on a project that used data from the 1970 census to plan locations for U.S. Army recruitment offices following the abolition of the draft. He returned to CACI’s UK office in 1977 and contributed to the development of the ACORN classification system.

In 1989, Humby left CACI to become joint founder and Chief Data Officer of global consumer insights business, dunnhumby, with his wife and long-term business partner, Edwina Dunn. The company applied science and technology to customer data, to help businesses understand consumer trends and behaviours. From their relationship with Tesco, they launched the Clubcard in 1995 - the first mass customisation loyalty programme in the world. Dunnhumby has offices in 25 countries employing 1500 people.

In 2006, Humby coined the phrase “Data is the new oil”. Michael Palmer expanded on Humby's quote by saying, like oil, data is “valuable, but if unrefined it cannot really be used. [Oil] has to be changed into gas, plastic, chemicals, etc to create a valuable entity that drives profitable activity; so, data must be broken down and analysed for it to have value.”

Humby and Dunn sold their stake in dunnhumby to Tesco in 2011. In 2012, they set up H&D Ventures, a business and data science team exploring the possibilities of telecoms and financial services data. In 2013 they became investors in Purple Seven, a theatre and arts analytics company, to evaluate the cultural behaviour of 19 million UK consumers.

In 2014, Humby was invited to join Starcount as Chief Data Scientist and the company acquired H&D Ventures in the process. Starcount is a data and analytics consultancy focused on exploring and extracting data-based insights.

Leadership style 
Humby espouses "The Power of Two" leadership principle. This teaches that the most effective way to operate is by pairing two people with complementary skills, e.g., analysts and marketers. It is a model he and Dunn instigated at dunnhumby, and which he continues to advocate to this day.

Personal life 
He married Edwina Dunn in 1982. They have two children.

Philanthropy 
Humby is a trustee of the Royal Academy, as well as chairman of the Friends of the Royal Academy.

Board directorships and honours 
He was awarded an OBE for services to Data and UK Business in the 2019 Birthday Honours.

He is on the retail advisory board of LetterOne, an international investment business. He is also a board director of Holland & Barrett.

Humby holds honorary doctorates in engineering from the University of Sheffield, and in Business Administration from Kingston University London. He is an Honorary Companion of the Operational Research Society. He holds Honorary Fellowships of the Institute of Mathematics and its Applications, the Institute of Direct & Digital Marketing, and the Market Research Society of which he is also Patron.

Books 
Humby, along with Terry Hunt and Tim Phillips co-authored the book entitled Scoring Points. Published in 2008 by Kogan Page Limited, Scoring Points explains how Tesco Clubcard was conceived, launched and developed.

References 

1955 births
Living people
20th-century British mathematicians
21st-century British mathematicians
People from Leicester
Alumni of the University of Sheffield
British company founders
20th-century British businesspeople
21st-century British businesspeople
Officers of the Order of the British Empire
People educated at Wyggeston Grammar School for Boys